Ross City is an unincorporated community in Howard County, Texas, United States.

Notes

Unincorporated communities in Howard County, Texas
Unincorporated communities in Texas